The 2015 Egypt bus accident occurred on 21 March 2015 when a bus fell off a bridge near Giza in Egypt. It plunged into a canal, killing at least 35, many of whom worked for a private construction company.

References

Egypt
Bus acident
Giza Governorate
Bus acident